Nacional Deva Boys is a Surinamese football club. The club evolved out of the merger of FCS Nacional and S.V. Deva Boys on 22 December 2013.

They play their home games in Houttuin, Wanica District at the Nacionello Stadion.

History
 2000: the club is renamed FCS Nacional from SV Boxel
 2010: the club is relegated for the first time under the name FCS Nacional, after withdrawing from the league
 2013: the club merges with S.V. Deva Boys under the name Nacional Deva Boys

Notable former coaches
  Andy Atmodimedjo (2007–2008)

Achievements
 Hoofdklasse:
 20031

 Beker van Suriname:
 20051

 Suriname President's Cup:
 20051

1. Trophies won as FCS Nacional.

References

Football clubs in Suriname
2013 establishments in Suriname